Nabikandi (also Romanized as Nabīkandī) is a village in Marhemetabad-e Jonubi Rural District, in the Central District of Miandoab County, West Azerbaijan Province, Iran. At the 2006 census, its population was 41, in 11 families.

References 

Populated places in Miandoab County